Maruti Ram Pedaprolu Murty, FRSC (born 16 October 1953) 
is an Indo-Canadian mathematician at Queen's University, where he holds a Queen's Research Chair in mathematics.

Biography
M. Ram Murty is the brother of mathematician V. Kumar Murty.

Murty graduated with a B.Sc. from Carleton University in 1976. He received his Ph.D. in 1980 from the Massachusetts Institute of Technology, supervised by Harold Stark and Dorian Goldfeld. He was on the faculty of McGill University from 1982 until 1996, when he joined Queen's University. Murty is also cross-appointed as a professor of philosophy at Queen's, specialising in Indian philosophy.

Research
Specializing in number theory, Murty is a researcher in the areas of modular forms, elliptic curves, and sieve theory.

Murty has Erdős number 1 and frequently collaborates with his brother, V. Kumar Murty.

Awards
Murty received the Coxeter–James Prize in 1988. He was elected a Fellow of the Royal Society of Canada in 1990, was elected to the Indian National Science Academy (INSA) in 2008, and became a fellow of the American Mathematical Society in 2012.

Selected publications

 .

 .

References

External links
 Murty's home page at Queen's

1953 births
20th-century Indian mathematicians
21st-century Indian mathematicians
Canada Research Chairs
Canadian Hindus
Canadian mathematicians
Carleton University alumni
Fellows of the American Mathematical Society
Fellows of the Royal Society of Canada
Foreign Fellows of the Indian National Science Academy
Indian emigrants to Canada
People from Guntur
Living people
Massachusetts Institute of Technology alumni
Indian number theorists
Academic staff of the Queen's University at Kingston
Academic staff of McGill University
Scientists from Andhra Pradesh
Number theorists